Hauteroche may refer to:

 Noël Lebreton de Hauteroche, a 17th-century French actor and playwright
 Hauteroche, Côte-d'Or, a commune in France
 Hauteroche, Jura, a commune in France
 Hauteroche Castle, a castle in Belgium